Igbodo is a town located in Delta State, Nigeria.

References 

Populated places in Delta State